The National Day of Catalonia is a day-long festival in Catalonia and one of its official national symbols, celebrated annually on 11 September. It commemorates the fall of Barcelona during the War of the Spanish Succession in 1714 and the subsequent loss of Catalan institutions and laws.

History

The Army of Catalonia that initially fought in support of the Habsburg dynasty's claim to the Spanish throne was finally defeated at the Siege of Barcelona by the armies of the Bourbon king Philip V of Spain on 11 September 1714 after 14 months of siege. That meant the loss of the Catalan constitutions and the institutional system of the Principality of Catalonia under the aegis of the Nueva Planta decrees, and the imposition of absolutism.

The holiday was first celebrated on 11 September 1886. In 1888, coinciding with the inauguration of the Barcelona Universal Exposition, a statue in honor of Rafael Casanova was set up, which would become the point of reference of the events of the Diada. The celebration gained popularity over the following years; the Diada of 1923 was a great mass event, with more than a thousand floral offerings, acts throughout Catalonia and a certain institutional participation. But the demonstrations caused 17 wounded, five policemen and 12 protesters, and several arrests. The dictatorship of Primo de Rivera banned the celebration. During the Second Spanish Republic (1931–1939), the Generalitat de Catalunya (the autonomous government of Catalonia) institutionalized the celebration.

It was suppressed by the Francoist dictatorship in 1939, and relegated to the family and private sphere, but continued to be celebrated clandestinely. The monument of Rafael Casanova was removed. Since 1940 the National Front of Catalonia took advantage of the day to carry out some propaganda actions: distribution of anti-fascist leaflets, clandestine hanging of senyeres, etc. It was celebrated again publicly for the first time on 11 September 1976, one year after the death of Francisco Franco, and it was followed by a huge demonstration in Barcelona demanding the restitution of Catalan autonomy the next year, on 11 September 1977, in which the Casanova's statue was repositioned in its place, and the celebration was reinstated officially in 1980 by the Generalitat de Catalunya, upon its restoration after the Francoist State, becoming the first law approved by the also restored Parliament of Catalonia.

Celebrations
Nationalist organizations, political parties and institutions traditionally lay floral offerings at monuments of those who led the defence of the city such as Rafael Casanova and General Moragues, marking their stand against the king Philip V of Spain. Typically, Catalan independentists organize demonstrations and meet at the Fossar de les Moreres in Barcelona, where they pay homage to the defenders of city who died during the siege and were buried there. Throughout the day, there are patriotic demonstrations and cultural events in many Catalan villages and many citizens wave senyeres and estelades. The event has become more explicitly political and particularly focused on independence rallies in the 2010s.

Gallery

See also
 2012 Catalan independence demonstration
 Catalan Way

References

External links 
 Official website of the National Day of Catalonia
 Documents about the case of the catalans dated on 1714, at the House of Lords, UK.
 Journal of the House of Lords: volume 19, 2 August 1715, Further Articles of Impeachment against E. Oxford brought from H.C. Article VI.

History of Catalonia
National days
September observances
Public holidays in Spain
Autumn events in Spain
Catalan nationalism